Piero Rodarte is a race car driver born in Mexico on November 30, 1983.

Rodarte competed in Karting in Mexico, winning several National Championships including the Formula Super A championship, from there he moved to race Formula Reynard in Mexico winning the championship in 1999, in 2000. He moved to race the USFF2000, having a lot of top 5s and finishing 3rd place at Indianapolis at the famous Night Before the 500, in 2001 he continued to race the USFF2000, having pole positions, several top 3's and victories, been the most important the one at the Night Before the 500 in Indianapolis, for 2002 Barber Dodge Pro Series, finishing 12th in the final standings, after his not very nice season in Barber Dodge, in 2003 he was hired in Mexico by Mopar to drive for the official team, winning the Neon Challenge Championship, in 2004 he only raced once at the F3 Winter Cup in Spain, having a great race, and fighting for the overall win at the rain with Nico Rosberg (now in F1), he finished 3rd,  and in 2005 returned to motorsport with the Spanish Formula Three Championship team ECA having several pole positions and victories, he ended the season in 3rd place even though he started the season at the third race due to the lack of money to complete the whole season. Now he is retired from professional racing and Piero owns a Formula Renault Team in Mexico and combines this with driver coaching in the US, and with his duties as a professional airplane pilot.

Complete motorsports results

American Open-Wheel racing results
(key) (Races in bold indicate pole position, races in italics indicate fastest race lap)

Complete USF2000 National Championship results

Barber Dodge Pro Series

References

External links
 

Mexican racing drivers
Euroformula Open Championship drivers
1983 births
Living people
Latin America Formula Renault 2000 drivers
LATAM Challenge Series drivers
Barber Pro Series drivers
U.S. F2000 National Championship drivers